"Who Wouldn't Wanna Be Me" is a song co-written and recorded by Australian country music singer Keith Urban. It was released in July 2003 as the third single from his 2002 album Golden Road. The song became his third number one hit on the U.S. Billboard Hot Country Singles & Tracks chart and peaked at number 30 on the U.S. Billboard Hot 100 chart. Urban wrote this song with Monty Powell.

Music video
The music video was directed by Sam Erickson and premiered in mid 2003. It features footage from Urban's 2003 summer tour, as well as shots of Urban riding a motorcycle.

Personnel
The following musicians perform on this track:
 Keith Urban — lead vocals, lead and rhythm guitar, ganjo
 Chris McHugh — drums, percussion
 Jason Mowery — mandolin
 Monty Powell — background vocals
 Jimmie Lee Sloas — bass guitar

Chart positions

Year-end charts

References

2003 singles
Keith Urban songs
Songs written by Keith Urban
Capitol Records Nashville singles
Songs written by Monty Powell
2002 songs